Negrelos (São Mamede) is a former civil parish in the municipality of Santo Tirso, Portugal. In 2013, the parish merged into the new parish Campo (São Martinho), São Salvador do Campo e Negrelos (São Mamede).

References

Former parishes of Santo Tirso